Ayatollah Ebrahim Amini (30 June 1925 – 24 April 2020) was an Iranian conservative politician who was a member of the Assembly of Experts. He was also a member of the Expediency Discernment Council, and was previously identified as a possible candidate to become the next Iranian Supreme Leader. Ayatollah Amini was a jurist and a moderate supporter of jurisprudential Islam. He was a member of the Council for the Revision of the Second Constitution in 1989 and was a supporter of the maximum ruling term of a Supreme Leader being ten years.

Amini was known as a critic of the government of former president Mahmoud Ahmedinejad.

Amini died in April 2020 at the age of 94, at the Shahid Beheshti Hospital in Qom.

See also
List of members of Constitutional Amendment Council of Iran
List of Ayatollahs
List of members in the First Term of the Council of Experts

References

External links

Iran faces 'social explosion'

1925 births
2020 deaths
Iranian ayatollahs
Iranian Islamists
Members of the Assembly of Experts
Members of the Expediency Discernment Council
People from Najafabad
Shia Islamists
Society of Seminary Teachers of Qom members
Deaths from the COVID-19 pandemic in Iran